Locker is an unincorporated community in San Saba County, in the U.S. state of Texas. According to the Handbook of Texas, the community had a population of 16 in 2000.

History
The area in what is known as Locker today was first settled in the 1870s. It also had the names Knob and Mount Pleasant. James Monroe Locker and his family came here from Bosque County in the 1890s and opened a store and cotton gin here. The community boomed afterward. There were numerous stores and craft shops, a Masonic and Woodmen of the World lodge, several churches, and an ice cream parlor in 1900. A post office was established at Locker in 1899 and remained in operation until the 1950s. Thomas H. Locker was the first postmaster and named it after another James Locker, a local businessman. The population went up to 200 in 1915 but declined after World War I. Locker lost half of its residential and business population in the mid-1920s. Mail was sent to the community from Richland Springs. Only a store and a cemetery remained here in the mid-1980s. Its population was 16 from 1967 through 2000.

Geography

Education
Mesquite and Competition Schools joined the Locker School in 1911, giving it a reputation as a rural school community. It joined the Richland Springs Independent School District in the 1950s.

References

Unincorporated communities in San Saba County, Texas
Unincorporated communities in Texas